The Big Three is a common nickname in tennis for the trio of Roger Federer, Rafael Nadal and Novak Djokovic, each considered to be among the greatest players of all time. The trio have dominated men's singles tennis for nearly two decades, collectively winning 64 major singles tournaments; Nadal and Djokovic with 22 titles, and Federer with 20. They have been ranked as world No. 1s in singles for a total 899 weeks (equivalent to 17 years); Djokovic for 380 weeks, Federer for 310, and Nadal for 209. One of the three finished the season as the year-end No. 1 player every year from 2004 to 2021, with the exception of 2016. They have collectively occupied the top-three positions of the year-end ATP rankings eight times; in 2007, 2008, 2009, 2010, 2011, 2014, 2018, and 2019.

The Big Four was used to describe the larger quartet of Federer, Nadal, Djokovic, and Andy Murray from about 2008 to 2017, though the term is occasionally still used when referring to the group in that period. They have been a critical part of what has been labelled a new "Golden Era" in tennis.

Federer was the first to come to prominence after winning Wimbledon in 2003, and became the world No. 1 after winning the Australian Open in 2004. Nadal followed in 2005 with a French Open triumph on his first attempt, including a win over Federer, and the duo occupied the top two places of the ATP rankings from July 2005 to August 2009. From 2007, Djokovic and Murray increasingly challenged Federer and Nadal's dominance with consistency. By 2011, Nadal declared that his joint dominance with Federer had ended, following the ascent of Djokovic and later Murray. Djokovic has been a dominant player since the beginning of 2011, gradually approaching or surpassing Federer and Nadal's career achievements. Despite occasional injury breaks by individual members of the Big Three, they maintained their collective dominance at the majors through to 2022. However, the emergence of new players, commonly referred to as the "Next Gen", have tempered their dominance at the ATP Finals and ATP Masters tournaments since 2017.

The Big Four regularly held the top four places in the year-end rankings between 2008 and 2013 and were ranked year-end world top four from 2008 to 2012, the longest span of dominance for any quartet of players in tennis history. They held the top-two spots continuously from 25 July 2005 to 14 March 2021, as well as the top ranking from 2 February 2004 to 28 February 2022, meaning that no player outside the Big Four were ranked world No. 1 for 18 years or was in the top 2 for nearly 16 years. All four have reached a career-high ranking of world No. 1: Djokovic has been No. 1 for a record 380 weeks, Federer for 310 weeks, Nadal for 209 weeks, and Murray for 41 weeks. Djokovic was the year-end No. 1 for a record seven years, with Federer and Nadal at five each, and Murray at one.

At the Grand Slam tournaments, the trio are the all-time title leaders; Nadal and Djokovic have each won a record 22 majors, and Federer 20. Nadal has won a record 14 French Open titles, Djokovic a record 10 Australian Open titles, and Federer a record eight Wimbledon titles. They have each completed a Career Grand Slam by winning all four majors at least once, with Djokovic and Nadal completing it twice for a double Career Grand Slam. Djokovic has completed a non-calendar year Grand Slam, making him the only man in history to hold all four majors at once across three different surfaces. Nadal and Djokovic have each achieved a Surface Slam by winning majors on hard, clay, and grass courts in a calendar year, making them the only male players in history to do so. The trio have each completed a Channel Slam, with Nadal having achieved it twice. At the ATP Masters tournaments, the trio are also the top-three title leaders; Djokovic leads with a record 38 titles, followed by Nadal with 36, and Federer with 28. Djokovic has achieved the Career Golden Masters by winning all nine active Masters tournaments, a feat he has completed twice. At the ATP Finals, they won 12 titles, with Federer and Djokovic winning a record six titles each. 

Representing their countries, the Big Four have played vital roles in leading their countries to victory at the Davis Cup, ATP Cup, and the Olympics. At the Davis Cup, Nadal helped Spain to win the title in five editions, Djokovic and Federer helped Serbia (2010) and Switzerland (2014) win their first title in the competition, and Murray helped Great Britain win the title in 2015. At the ATP Cup, Djokovic led Serbia to victory in the inaugural edition in 2020. At the Olympics, the Big Four have won five gold medals, two silver medals, and one bronze medal; Murray won a record two gold medals in singles and a silver in mixed doubles, Nadal won a gold medal in singles, following which he achieved a Career Golden Slam, and another gold in doubles, Federer won a silver medal in singles and one gold in doubles, while Djokovic won a bronze medal in singles. Federer is the only member to have won Hopman Cup for his nation, in 2001, 2018, and 2019.

History

Federer and Nadal era

2003 Wimbledon–2004: Federer's ascendance to the top of the game

The early 2000s were seen as a time of transition in tennis, with older champions retiring and a few players breaking through at the very top of the game. Roger Federer first played on the ATP Tour aged 17 in 1998, finishing his first full ATP season the following year. By the end of the 2002 season, he was ranked sixth in the world. His breakthrough came in 2003 when he won his first major title at Wimbledon, won the year-end championships, and finished the year as the world No. 2 behind Andy Roddick. Federer then captured three of the four majors in 2004, losing only at the French Open, as well as becoming the world No. 1 on 2 February and maintaining the top position through the end of the year. Federer entered the 2004 Summer Olympics as the heavy favourite, but lost in the second round to Tomáš Berdych.

Rafael Nadal won his first ATP Tour match aged 15 in April 2002, and he defeated Federer in their first meeting at the 2004 Miami Open.

2005–2007: Federer continues dominance, Nadal dominates clay

In the following three years (2005–2007), Federer almost dominated the tennis scene entirely. Between 2005 Wimbledon and 2007 US Open, he captured eight of ten majors with a record of 67–2 in those tournaments (his only two losses in that stretch were delivered by Nadal at the French Open). Federer also maintained the world No. 1 ranking for the entirety of the period.

2005 was Nadal's breakthrough year, in which he won 24 consecutive matches on clay, including his first French Open title, beating Federer in the semifinals, and he finished the year as the world No. 2. He was dominant on clay, suffering only one loss on the surface (to Federer at the 2007 Hamburg Masters final) between his breakthrough and the end of 2007. He established an 81-match winning streak on clay during this time.

The period between 2005 and 2007 was thus entirely dominated by Federer and Nadal. They won 11 consecutive majors between them, meeting in each French Open and Wimbledon final from 2006 to 2008. From 2005 to 2010, they ended each season as the world's top two players.

Novak Djokovic and Andy Murray were born a week apart, played each other as juniors, and both made their major debuts in 2005. Djokovic made his ATP Tour debut in 2004, while Murray's was in 2005. They both reached the world's top 100 in 2005, and the top 20 in 2006. Djokovic, however, began to excel ahead of Murray in 2007, reaching one major final and two semifinals and beginning to regularly challenge Federer and Nadal. He also won two Masters titles and five overall titles during the season, finishing 2007 as the world No. 3. Murray, who was kept out of the French Open and Wimbledon by injury, ended 2007 ranked 11th.

Big Four era

2008–2010: Federer and Nadal dominance, Djokovic and Murray challenge

Between 2008 and 2010, Djokovic and later Murray attempted to end the duopoly of Federer and Nadal at the summit of tennis. They did not break it but emerged ahead of the rest of the tour.

At the 2008 Australian Open, Djokovic defeated Federer in the semifinals, reaching his first Australian Open final and ending Federer's streak of ten consecutive major finals. Djokovic went on to defeat Jo-Wilfried Tsonga (who had eliminated Nadal in the semifinals) to win his first major. Following the win, Djokovic emerged as a clear world No. 3, holding the ranking for the entirety of 2008. Meanwhile, Murray continued to rise in the rankings, reaching his first major quarterfinal at Wimbledon, losing to Nadal. He also won his first two Masters titles.

Nonetheless, Federer–Nadal remained the lead rivalry, as the pair met in the finals of both the French Open and Wimbledon. Nadal won both, with the latter final often described as one of the greatest tennis matches of all time. In August, after winning singles gold at the 2008 Beijing Olympics and an early loss for Federer at the Cincinnati Masters, Nadal became the world No. 1, ending Federer's record 237 consecutive week streak at the top. At the Olympics, Federer lost in the quarterfinals to James Blake, while Djokovic lost in the semifinals to Nadal, but went on to win the bronze medal. Federer excelled in the men's doubles event and captured the gold medal, while Djokovic lost in the first round, and Murray and Nadal in the second. At the US Open, all four players reached the semifinals of the same major for the first time. Federer defeated Djokovic in the semifinals, while Murray reached his first major final after upsetting the top-ranked Nadal in four sets. Federer then defeated Murray in the final to win his fifth consecutive US Open title and his 13th major title overall. Following the tournament, Murray entered the top four in the ATP rankings for the first time. All four players qualified for the year-end championships, which Djokovic won. Despite withdrawing from the event due to injury, Nadal ended the year ranked as the world No. 1.

In 2009, the quartet held the top four places in the rankings for the entire calendar year. This also prompted the first uses of the term 'Big Four' to refer to the players, although results saw Nadal and Federer generally remain clear leaders ahead of Djokovic and Murray, who in turn were regarded as ahead of the rest of the tour. At the Australian Open, Nadal won his first title there in another five-set final, his third consecutive major final victory over Federer, while Murray and Djokovic were eliminated earlier. Nadal continued to dominate in most of the early season. He entered the French Open as the favourite, but was defeated in a massive upset by Robin Söderling in the fourth round. Federer went on to win his first French Open title, defeating Söderling in the final. With the win, he equaled Pete Sampras' all-time record of 14 Grand Slam singles titles and completed the Career Grand Slam, having lost to Nadal at each of the previous four editions of the French Open. Federer subsequently surpassed Sampras' record by winning his 15th major title at Wimbledon.

With Nadal's injuries, Murray and Djokovic improved in the rankings, with Murray reaching world No. 2 in August and ending the 211-week reign of Federer and Nadal as the top two ranked players. At the US Open, Murray was upset in the fourth round by Marin Čilić, while Djokovic reached his first Grand Slam semifinal of the season, losing in straight sets to Federer. Nadal was defeated by Juan Martín del Potro in the semifinals, and del Potro beat Federer in the final to claim the title. Between 2005 Australian Open and 2014 Australian Open, this was the only major not won by a member of the Big Four. At the end of 2009, Federer, Nadal, Djokovic and Murray finished as the ATP's top four players for the second consecutive year, with only Nadal and Federer changing positions from 2008. Federer finished the season having reached all four major finals for the third time in his career following 2006 and 2007.

During the 2010 season, the Big Four began to dominate the tour as a group for the first time. They comprised six of the eight Grand Slam finalists and won a combined 16 tournaments (compared to six for the other four competitors at the 2010 ATP Finals). At the start of the year, Federer continued his dominance as the world No. 1 by winning the Australian Open, defeating Murray in the final, but his run of 23 consecutive Grand Slam semifinals came to an end at the French Open when he lost to Robin Söderling in the fourth round. He then lost to Tomáš Berdych at Wimbledon, ending his run of seven consecutive Wimbledon finals. Nadal then resumed his domination of the clay-court season, winning all three clay-court Masters events and the French Open, where he defeated Söderling in the final. Nadal also won Wimbledon over Berdych, having missed the previous year's edition due to injury.

At the US Open, Djokovic beat Federer in the semifinals to reach his third major final, but lost to Nadal, who went on to complete the Career Grand Slam. With the win, Nadal became the first player to win majors on three different surfaces in a single calendar year, known as the Surface Slam. Each member of the Big Four reached the 2010 ATP Finals semifinals with Federer defeating Nadal in three sets in the final, leading to them achieving their third successive season in the top four positions. Djokovic and Murray were third and fourth respectively, both reaching one Grand Slam final apiece.

2011–2013: Big Four dominance

The 2011 season was dominated by Novak Djokovic. He won ten titles, including three majors (only the fifth man in the Open Era to do so) and five Masters titles (a then-record), enjoyed a 41-match winning streak (from the start of the season to his loss to Federer in the semifinals of the French Open), amassed a record amount in prize money, and ascended to the world No. 1 position for the first time in July. The season was described by many experts and former players as one of the best tennis seasons for a singles player seen in history, with Tennis Magazine describing it as the third-best tennis season ever, behind Federer's 2006 season, and Rod Laver's in 1969. Pete Sampras described it as "one of the best achievements in all of sport."

Djokovic's dominance contributed to overall control by the Big Four. They all reached the semifinals at two of the year's Grand Slam events, and between them won every Masters tournament. Nadal was the clear world No. 2 behind Djokovic, winning the French Open and reaching both the Wimbledon and US Open finals (losing both to Djokovic). Nadal ended the season with a 0–6 record against Djokovic, with every encounter between them at a final.

By his standards, Federer had a weak season. He failed to win a Grand Slam title for the first time since 2002, losing to Nadal for the fourth time in a French Open final. He dropped to world No. 4 in November, the first time he had been ranked outside the top three since 2002. However, Federer rallied, winning his three final tournaments, including the ATP Finals, which secured an end-of-season ranking of world No. 3. Murray, meanwhile, made the semifinals of all four majors, with including a runner-up finish in the Australian Open final to Djokovic. Murray ended the year with two Masters titles for the fourth consecutive year, and five titles in total.

The dominance of the Big Four continued in 2012. Each player won a major: Djokovic the Australian Open, Nadal the French Open, Federer Wimbledon and Murray (who hired former world number 1 Ivan Lendl as his head coach earlier in the year) his maiden major title at the US Open. This win – combined with winning the gold medal at the London Olympics at Wimbledon with consecutive victories over Djokovic and Federer – increased Murray's standing as a member of the Big Four: his end-of-season ranking of world No. 3 was his career-best. Federer would get the silver at the Olympics while Djokovic would lose the bronze medal match to Juan Martín del Potro of Argentina. Nadal did not compete due to a knee injury. In the men's doubles, none of them would get past the second round. Djokovic entered the season as the world No. 1 and remained there until July 2012, when he was overtaken by Federer, who reclaimed the top spot for the first time in two years. Federer subsequently overtook Sampras' all-time record of 286 weeks as the world No. 1, and extended the record to 302. Federer relinquished his world No. 1 ranking on 5 November to Djokovic, who ended the a second consecutive season there. Djokovic was the only player to reach the semifinals at all majors, defeating Nadal in the final of the Australian Open (in what is considered to be one of the greatest tennis matches of all time), and was the runner-up at both Roland Garros and the US Open. He and Federer each won three Masters tournaments. Federer was also the silver medalist at the Olympics, where Djokovic finished fourth. Nadal, meanwhile, had his season curtailed by an injury. Having won two clay-court Masters tournaments and Roland Garros, he was eliminated in the second round at Wimbledon – his earliest defeat at a Grand Slam tournament since 2005. He did not compete for the rest of the season, but still ended the year as world No. 4.

The 2013 season continued similarly, with Djokovic, Federer and Murray occupying three of the four semifinal slots at the Australian Open, with Nadal still suffering from an injury. Murray beat Federer in a five-set semifinal match, meaning all four members of the Big Four had beaten each other at least once at a major, but he lost to Djokovic in the final. Nadal returned for the clay-court season, winning five events before becoming the only man to win a major eight times by taking the French Open, defeating Djokovic in an epic semifinal clash en route. However, Djokovic ended Nadal's record eight-year winning streak at the Monte-Carlo Masters. Nadal and Federer lost early at Wimbledon, thus ending Federer's record streak of 36 consecutive major quarterfinals. Murray defeated Djokovic in the final, becoming the first Briton to win the men's singles title in 77 years. Nadal dominated the US Open series, winning the Canada Masters, Cincinnati Masters, and US Open, defeating Djokovic in the final of the latter.

Nadal and Djokovic dominated the 2013 season. Nadal won two Majors and five Masters events, and was runner-up at the ATP Finals. Nadal made the final at all eight clay-court tournaments he played, winning six; he also made the semifinals at all eight of his hard-court tournaments, winning four titles. Djokovic won one major, reached two major finals and a semifinal, and finished the year on a 22-match winning streak after taking the ATP Finals. A back injury ended Murray's season prematurely, but he finished fourth in the rankings and was the only player besides Nadal and Djokovic to win a Grand Slam event or Masters title (at Wimbledon and Miami respectively). Federer suffered his worst season in over a decade. He reached just one major semifinal at the Australian Open, failed to win a single Masters crown, and finished the year sixth in the rankings with one title to his name; he also suffered from a recurring back injury throughout the season.

2014: Dominance in majors halted

As 2013 came to a close, Federer's fall in the rankings prompted many sources to debate whether the dominance of the Big Four had ended. This debate intensified after the Australian Open, which saw Stan Wawrinka defeat Djokovic in the quarterfinal and Nadal in the final to win his first Slam title, marking just the second time since 2005 and the first since 2009 that a player outside the Big Four had won a major title. Murray and Federer fell to sixth and eighth in the rankings respectively, and after the tournament, several players expressed the opinion that they were now capable of challenging the Big Four. However, the first two Masters titles of the year in Indian Wells and Miami only had Big Four finalists, with Djokovic winning his third and fourth consecutive Masters titles with victories over Federer and Nadal respectively. Nadal struggled early in the clay season at his traditional favorite tournaments of Monte-Carlo and Barcelona. A third loss, to Djokovic in the final of the Rome Masters, was the first time Nadal had lost more than two matches on clay in a season for a decade. He did, however, win the Madrid Masters after Nishikori injured his back whilst leading Nadal 6–2, 4–3 in that final. Nadal went on to defend his French Open title, defeating Murray in the semifinal and Djokovic in the final.

Following his back surgery at the end of 2013, Murray struggled to return to form in the first half of the year, reaching only two semifinals and losing to Grigor Dimitrov in straight sets in the quarterfinals while attempting to defend his Wimbledon title, a defeat which saw him fall to No. 10 in the world rankings. This, and Nadal's loss to Nick Kyrgios in the fourth round, his third consecutive early-round loss at Wimbledon, led former players and experts, including Jimmy Connors, to express the opinion that the "aura" around the Big Four had faded. Milos Raonic, who reached the semifinals at Wimbledon, suggested a "human side" was visible in the Big Four, which was giving players belief when facing them. However, Djokovic defeated Dimitrov and Federer beat Raonic to make it an all-Big Four final, the 24th they had contested. Djokovic defeated Federer in five sets to claim his second Wimbledon title, a result that left Djokovic, Nadal and Federer occupying the top three places in the rankings.

Federer continued his return to form reaching the finals of Toronto and winning his first Masters title since 2012 in Cincinnati. Later, he also won the Shanghai Masters, and returned to No. 2 in the rankings, overtaking Nadal, whose season had been curtailed by a wrist injury. The US Open 2014 saw the Big Four's collective grip on the major titles slip still further, however, as Kei Nishikori and Marin Čilić beat Djokovic and Federer in the semifinals respectively to contest the first Slam final featuring none of the Big Four since the 2005 Australian Open, and the first time since 2003 that multiple first-time Grand Slam tournament winners have been crowned in a single season. Following the tournament, Murray dropped to 11th in the rankings, his first time outside the top ten since 2008. The tournament  further signalled the decline of the Big Four's dominance. Towards the end of the year, Murray managed to return to form, winning three titles in Shenzhen, Vienna and Valencia, allowing him to return to the top ten in the rankings and qualify for the Tour Finals, but he bowed out at the group stages following a defeat by Federer, in which he won just a single game. Indeed, throughout the year, Murray failed to register a single victory against another member of the Big Four in nine meetings.

At the Tour finals, Federer and Djokovic both reached the final, but Federer withdrew citing injury following a semifinal win over Wawrinka. Federer recovered to win the Davis Cup as part of the Switzerland team for his, and the country's, first triumph in the competition, leading many people to say that his tennis career was now complete. Collectively, the Big Four won 19 titles in 2014, but two Slam titles and two Masters titles went to other players. In the end-of-year rankings, Djokovic, Federer and Nadal held the top three spots, with Murray in sixth.

2015–2016: Djokovic domination, Murray and Federer challenge

Following Murray's strong end to 2014 and reaching the final of the 2015 Australian Open, he moved into the top four in the ATP rankings for the first time in over a year, meaning that the Big Four held the top four places in the rankings for the first time since early 2013, slowing the idea of the regression of the quartet. Djokovic won the title, as well as the first three Masters titles of the year in Indian Wells, Miami and Monte-Carlo. In Madrid, Murray defeated Nadal in straight sets. This was also the first time he had beaten another member of the Big Four in a tour match since Wimbledon 2013, ending a streak of 12 losses against the other members. The defeat saw Nadal slip to seventh in the rankings, his first time outside the top five in more than a decade. Djokovic defeated Federer in the Rome final. Nadal suffered his worst European clay-court season in a decade, failing to win a single title and appearing in just one final, whereas Djokovic and Murray entered the second Grand Slam event of the year unbeaten on clay. Djokovic defeated Nadal for the first time at the French Open in a straight-sets quarterfinal. This was only Nadal's second defeat at the French Open, seeing him drop to No. 10 in the rankings. Djokovic emerged victorious over Murray in a five-set match that was spread over two days but succumbed to Wawrinka in the final in four sets.

Federer beat Murray in straight sets in the semifinals of Wimbledon. Djokovic claimed the other spot in the final, to set up a rematch of the previous year's final, and defeated Federer in four sets to win his second major of the year, denying Federer a record eighth Wimbledon title for the second year in a row. Murray and Federer shared the two North American hard-court Masters titles, at Montreal and Cincinnati respectively, with Djokovic being the losing finalist on both occasions. The US Open final was contested by Djokovic and Federer. Djokovic won in four sets, giving him a third slam title of the season.

Djokovic then continued to dominate throughout the remainder of the year, winning in Beijing, Shanghai, Paris and at the ATP Finals.  Overall, Djokovic's 2015 season was one of the greatest in the history of the game, with him winning 11 titles (the most since Federer won 12 in 2006) including, for the second time, three majors. He also became the only man in the Open Era besides Federer and Rod Laver to reach all four major finals in the same year. He was dominant even against his fellow Big Four rivals, going 15–4 against them throughout the year. Federer was the most competitive against Djokovic, winning three of their eight matches, which made up half of Djokovic's total defeats in 2015. Nadal and Murray both struggled against the Serb, with Nadal losing all four of his encounters in straight sets, and Murray winning only one of his seven encounters, in Montreal. However, Murray did lead Great Britain to Davis Cup victory in 2015, winning all eight singles rubbers and becoming the final member of the quartet to win the Davis Cup. Murray did finish at his career-highest year-end ranking of two even if he won fewer titles, reached fewer finals and had less success versus Djokovic when compared with Federer in the number three ranking.

In 2016, Djokovic collected his sixth Australian Open title in a straight-sets victory over Murray. He followed up this solid run of form with a record-setting fifth Indian Wells and record-equaling sixth Miami masters titles. Nadal won Monte Carlo for a record ninth time. Murray and Djokovic played in the finals of Madrid and Rome and split the titles. At the 2016 French Open, Murray reached his first Paris final to complete his set of Grand Slam singles finals, but Djokovic beat him in the final to become the third Big Four member after Federer and Nadal to complete a Career Grand Slam, and the first player since Rod Laver in 1969 to hold all four Grand Slam titles at the same time.

In the Wimbledon final, Murray beat Raonic in straight sets to win his second Wimbledon title, and third major title overall. Murray's victory marked the first time since the 2010 French Open that a member of the Big Four had won a Grand Slam singles title without having to defeat one of the other three members. Federer withdrew from the remainder of the 2016 season due to a knee injury, missing the Olympics and US Open.

At the Olympics, Djokovic was knocked out of the men's singles in the opening round by Juan Martín del Potro, in a repeat of the bronze medal match from four years earlier. Del Potro went on to defeat Nadal in an epic semifinal to set up a final meeting with Murray. Murray ultimately won the final in four sets, becoming the first male player to win the singles gold medal twice. Nadal lost the bronze medal match to Kei Nishikori but won gold in the men's doubles event. Djokovic won Toronto with Murray losing in the finals of Cincinnati. At the US Open, Djokovic reached the final but was defeated once again by Stan Wawrinka in a Grand Slam singles final.

Murray dominated the rest of the year. He won titles in Beijing, Shanghai, Vienna and Paris. As a result, upon reaching the Paris final, Murray gained the number-one ranking, ending Djokovic's 122 consecutive weeks at the top. This meant that all of the Big Four had reached world number one at some point. Following an early loss at Shanghai, Nadal announced that he would skip the remainder of the 2016 season to recover fully from the wrist injury that troubled him earlier in the year. Thus, for the first time since 2001, neither Nadal nor Federer would be present at the year-end championships. At the ATP Finals, Murray beat Djokovic 6–3, 6–4, claiming the title and the No. 1 spot at the end of the year and ending 2016 on a 24-match winning streak, the longest of his career. He became the second player after Andre Agassi to win a Grand Slam singles tournament, ATP Finals, Olympic and Masters titles, and the first to do so in the same calendar year. 2016 marked the first year since 2003 that neither Federer, Nadal or Djokovic finished the year as world number 1. Despite his struggles with form throughout the second half of the year, Djokovic still ended 2016 as world number two. Having suffered from injury-plagued seasons, Nadal and Federer ended the year at number nine and 16 respectively. For Nadal, it was his lowest end-of-year ranking since 2004, while Federer's fall in the rankings meant that November 2016 marked his first time outside the top ten since October 2002.

Big Three solidified

2017–2018 French Open: Federer and Nadal return, Djokovic and Murray sidelined

At the Australian Open, Djokovic and Murray both suffered defeats prior the quarterfinals. Nadal and Federer, meanwhile, both progressed to the final after each won five-set semifinals. In the highly anticipated final, Federer triumphed over Nadal in five sets, winning his 18th Grand Slam title and his first since Wimbledon 2012. Federer went on to win a record-equaling fifth Indian Wells title, defeating Nadal in the fourth round. Federer and Nadal once again met in the Miami Open final, where Federer again won.

As the 2017 clay court swing commenced, Federer skipped the entire clay season to rest and focus on the grass and hard-court seasons, as well as to prolong his career. Nadal claimed the Monte-Carlo Masters title, which saw him become the first man to win a single tournament ten times and simultaneously establish a new record for the most clay-court titles at 50, surpassing Guillermo Vilas' 49. Nadal also won in Madrid, while Djokovic fell to Alexander Zverev in the Rome final. Nadal breezed through to the French Open title, defeating Wawrinka in the final and not dropping a set at the tournament for the third time in his career. This marked Nadal's first major title since the 2014 French Open. Following the win, Nadal returned to world No. 2, while Djokovic, who lost in the quarterfinals, fell to world No. 4, his lowest ranking since October 2009 and his first time outside the top two of the rankings since March 2011.

At Wimbledon, the quartet formed the top four seeds at a major for the first time since 2014. Nadal, Murray and Djokovic all lost before the semifinals. Federer, however, won the title without dropping a set by beating Marin Čilić in the final. Federer's run marked a record-breaking eleventh Wimbledon final and eighth title. This led to the "Big Four" being the ATP top four again. Djokovic announced in July that he would skip the rest of the 2017 season to recover from an elbow injury, and Murray did not play another tournament in 2017 as well due to a hip injury. At the Montreal Masters, Federer reached the final but sustained a severe back injury there, which took him out of contention for the US Open and the No. 1 ranking. Although Nadal did not reach the semifinals of either North American Masters event, he returned to world No. 1 over the inactive Murray. Nadal then defeated Kevin Anderson in the US Open final. This was the fourth time that Nadal and Federer had won all four majors in the same year, following their sweeps in 2006, 2007, and 2010. Additionally, on 11 September 2017, Nadal and Federer were ranked No. 1 and No. 2, respectively, the first time since 20 March 2011 that they held the top two rankings spots. Federer then returned to Shanghai and won his second title there, defeating Nadal in the final. This was his fourth win out of four meetings with Nadal in 2017, as well as his fifth consecutive.

In 2017, Nadal had his best year since 2013, winning two majors and four other titles. Federer finished the year at world No. 2 behind Nadal and overall had his best year since 2007, with his highest number of titles won since that year, winning two majors for the first time since 2009, and ending the year with a winning percentage of 91%, his highest since 2006. Djokovic and Murray both finished with their lowest year-end rankings since 2006, at No. 12 and 16 respectively.

At the start of 2018, Murray underwent hip surgery for the injury that had sidelined him since the previous summer. Djokovic and Nadal lost early at the Australian Open. Federer, however, went on to defend his title in a five-set final against Marin Čilić, thus equaling Djokovic and Roy Emerson's record of six Australian Open titles, and becoming the first man to win 20 major titles. Soon after, by reaching the semifinals in Rotterdam, Federer overtook returned to world No. 1. In doing so, he became the oldest-ever player to top the ATP rankings (since 1973).

Federer reached the final of Indian Wells, but lost to Juan Martín del Potro. Federer's early loss in Miami resulted in the loss of the No. 1 ranking with Nadal overtaking him by 100 points. Federer announced that he would again skip the entire clay-court season. Nadal won his eleventh title in Monte Carlo, then claimed an 11th Barcelona title, winning both without dropping a set. Nadal's loss to Dominic Thiem in the Madrid quarterfinals returned the No. 1 ranking back to Federer for one week until Nadal won the title in Rome.

Following Djokovic's early exit from the Australian Open, he underwent surgery for the wrist injury that had been causing him issues for the previous year. He returned to the tour at Indian Wells and struggled much with form, failing to reach the quarterfinals of any of his first five tournaments after surgery. He showed promise by reaching the semifinals of Rome, losing to Nadal in two tight sets. He reached the quarterfinals of the French Open, but lost to unseeded Marco Cecchinato. Nadal went on to win the tournament, defeating Dominic Thiem in the final to claim a record-extending 11th French Open title and his 17th major overall. Federer returned to the tour for Stuttgart and won the title there, which saw him return to the No. 1 ranking for a 310th week.

2018 Wimbledon–2020 Australian Open: Djokovic returns, dominates with Nadal

At 2018 Wimbledon, Federer lost to Kevin Anderson in the quarterfinals despite holding a two-sets-to-love lead and holding a match point in the third set, having suffered a hand injury at the start of the grass season. Djokovic and Nadal, meanwhile, made the semifinals, where twetlfth-seeded Djokovic defeated world No. 1 Nadal in five sets to reach his first major final in nearly two years. He then defeated Anderson in the final to win his fourth Wimbledon title and 13th major title overall.

At the 2018 US Open, both Djokovic and Nadal made the semifinals, where Nadal retired against Juan Martín del Potro after being two sets down due to a knee injury he sustained during the tournament. Djokovic, on the other hand, defeated Kei Nishikori to make his eighth US Open final, where he beat del Potro for his 14th major title. He then followed this up with victory at the Shanghai Masters.

Nadal withdrew before his first match at the Paris Masters, thus yielding the No. 1 ranking to Djokovic. Djokovic and Federer met in the semifinals, where Djokovic won in three hours. Djokovic was defeated by Karen Khachanov in the final. Nadal withdrew from the ATP Finals to undergo surgery for an ankle injury. Federer and Djokovic were both defeated at the ATP Finals by Alexander Zverev in the semifinals and final, respectively. The year ended with Djokovic, Nadal and Federer occupying the top-three positions in the rankings.

In the 2019 Australian Open, Federer was upset in the fourth round by 20-year-old Stefanos Tsitsipas in a tight four-setter. In the final, Djokovic defeated Nadal in straight sets to claim a record-winning seventh Australian Open title and increased his major tally to 15. In the week following the Australian Open, Murray underwent another hip surgery.

Federer rebounded from his early loss at the Australian Open by winning his 100th title in Dubai. He followed this with a runner-up finish at Indian Wells and a title in Miami.

After withdrawing from Indian Wells due to injury, Nadal initially struggled upon returning for the clay-court season, losing in the semifinals at Monte Carlo, Barcelona and Madrid. However, he returned to form in Rome, defeating Djokovic in the final to win his ninth crown at the event. At the French Open, Federer returned to play at the tournament for the first time since 2015, reaching the semifinals where he was defeated by Nadal in straight sets. Djokovic also reached the semifinals without losing a set, but was beaten in five sets by Dominic Thiem in a match that was spread over two days due to rain. In the final, Nadal prevailed over Thiem for a second consecutive year, winning the tournament for a record-extending 12th time. The win brought Nadal to 18 major titles, just two behind Federer's record of 20. Federer, meanwhile, won his tenth title in Halle, making him the only player in the Open Era besides Nadal to win ten titles at the same event.

In Wimbledon, Nadal and Federer again met in the semifinals, their first meeting at Wimbledon since the 2008 final. Federer defeated Nadal in four sets to reach the final, where he faced Djokovic. There, Djokovic defeated Federer in the longest Wimbledon men's final in history. It was Djokovic's 16th major title, only trailing Federer's 20 and Nadal's 18.

Nadal returned in Montreal where he defended his title. Following his victory, he decided not to play in Cincinnati once again. Murray, meanwhile, continued his comeback to tennis through doubles, however, he returned to singles in Cincinnati, where he lost in the first round to Richard Gasquet in straight sets. There, Federer was upset in the third round by qualifier Andrey Rublev, and Djokovic was upset in the semifinals by the eventual champion Daniil Medvedev.

At the US Open, Djokovic retired against Stan Wawrinka in the fourth round due to a shoulder injury, and Federer was upset by Grigor Dimitrov in the quarterfinals. Nadal only dropped one set en route to his fifth US Open final, where he met Daniil Medvedev. Despite Nadal going up two sets to love, Medvedev responded furiously and claimed the next two sets. Nadal then defeated Medvedev 6–4 in the fifth set, claiming his fourth US Open title and 19th major title overall, one behind Federer's record.

Nadal ended 2019 as the world No. 1 for the fifth time, despite not reaching the semifinals of ATP Finals. In the 2019 Davis Cup, Spain won its sixth title (its first since 2011), defeating Canada in the final 2–0. Nadal received the Most Valuable Player (MVP) award for his performance in the tournament after he won all eight matches in which he participated. This was Nadal's fifth Davis Cup title.

At the 2020 Australian Open, Nadal lost to Dominic Thiem in the quarterfinals, while Djokovic defeated Federer in the semifinals. Djokovic then won his eighth Australian Open title and his 17th major overall by a narrow victory over Thiem in the final.

2020–2021: Disrupted seasons, Nadal and Djokovic tie Federer's major record

The 2020 season was disrupted by the COVID-19 pandemic. Four of the five Masters tournaments typically held between the Australian and the French Open were cancelled, with the Italian Open the only one to be postponed. The French Open itself was postponed to late September, while Wimbledon was cancelled. The first Masters to be held after the resumption of the tour was the Cincinnati Masters, where Djokovic emerged victorious to complete the double Career Golden Masters.

Nadal opted to skip the US Open, citing concerns over the COVID-19 pandemic, while Federer withdrew due to a knee injury. Djokovic was disqualified from the tournament during his fourth-round match against Pablo Carreño-Busta after inadvertently striking a ball at a line judge after conceding a break. The title was won by Dominic Thiem, who became the first player outside the Big Three to win a major since Stan Wawrinka in 2016. Djokovic rebounded to win a record 36th Masters title in the Italian Open two weeks later. Federer did not enter the rescheduled French Open, still sidelined by his knee injury. Nadal successfully defended his title over Djokovic in a straight-sets final. With the win, Nadal equaled Federer's all-time record of 20 major singles titles and extended his own record to 13 titles from the same major tournament.

Federer did not compete in the 2021 Australian Open in order to recover from surgery. There, Nadal was upset by Stefanos Tsitsipas in the quarterfinals despite taking a two-sets-to-love lead, while Djokovic successfully defended his title by beating Daniil Medvedev in straight sets. The win marked his ninth Australian Open title and 18th major title overall, putting him two titles away from tying Federer and Nadal.

Nadal achieved his 36th Masters victory by defeating Djokovic in the Italian Open final. At the French Open, Federer withdrew after his third round victory in order not to jeopardize his recovery from a knee injury, while Nadal's bid at winning a record 21st major ended when he lost to Djokovic in an epic semifinal encounter. Despite being down two sets to love in the final against Stefanos Tsitsipas, Djokovic rallied to win the title in five sets. With the victory, Djokovic won his second French Open title and 19th major singles title overall, and became the third man to have won each of the four majors at least twice or more (after Roy Emerson and Rod Laver), and the first to do so in the Open Era. Djokovic was then only one title away from tying Federer and Nadal for the most men's singles majors of all time.

Nadal withdrew from Wimbledon due to scheduling reasons. Federer was defeated in the quarterfinals by Hubert Hurkacz. Djokovic won the title and his 20th major against Matteo Berrettini, thereby equaling both Federer and Nadal's all-time tally. The victory made him the first man to win the Australian Open, French Open and Wimbledon titles in the same calendar year since Rod Laver in 1969, and the second player to win majors on three different surfaces in a calendar year, after Nadal in 2010.

Djokovic had hoped to emulate Steffi Graf's 1988 Golden Slam in men's tennis by winning the singles Olympic gold and the US Open. However, he lost in the semifinals of Tokyo Olympics to Alexander Zverev, despite being up a set and a break, and subsequently lost the bronze medal match to Pablo Carreño Busta.

At the US Open, Federer pulled out of the tournament due to his need for further knee surgery, while Nadal also withdrew due to a nagging foot injury. Djokovic lost in the final to Daniil Medvedev, preventing him from winning a record 21 majors and achieving a Grand Slam, which would have been the first in men's tennis since Rod Laver in 1969. Medvedev thus became the twelfth player outside the Big Three to win a major since Federer's first win at 2003 Wimbledon.

At the Paris Masters, Djokovic defeated Medvedev in the final to win his sixth Paris Masters title and surpass Nadal for the most Masters titles at 37. By reaching the final, Djokovic also clinched the year-end No. 1 ranking for the seventh time, surpassing Pete Sampras' all-time record.

2022–23: Nadal & Djokovic win 22nd majors, Federer retires 

Djokovic was unable to compete at the Australian Open for being unvaccinated against COVID-19. Despite multiple appeals for exemption, he was denied a visa to enter the country, which prevented him from defending his title. Federer was unable to compete due to a persistent knee injury while Nadal returned to compete, after a lengthy six-month injury hiatus and a positive COVID-19 result. Despite playing with low expectations, Nadal progressed to the quarterfinals, where he defeated Denis Shapovalov, and Matteo Berrettini in the semifinals. In the 5-hour 24-minute final, he defeated Daniil Medvedev, after coming back from a two-set deficit, to win his record-breaking 21st major and establish a new all-time record for the most men's majors singles titles. He became the fourth man in history to complete the double Career Grand Slam in singles, and the second after Djokovic in the Open Era.

In February 2022, Medvedev became the world No. 1-ranked player, following Djokovic's loss in the quarterfinals of the Dubai Championships, thus ending the Big Four's streak of 921 weeks at the top of the ATP rankings (the streak began on 2 February 2004 when Federer overtook Andy Roddick).

Federer did not participate at the French Open. Nadal and Djokovic both progressed to a quarterfinal encounter, with Nadal emerging victorious in four sets. Nadal went to contest his 30th major final against Casper Ruud, winning a staggering 14th French Open title and 22nd major overall. He extended the all-time record for the most men's singles titles and became the third man after Mats Wilander (1982 French Open) and Federer (2017 Australian Open) to defeat four Top-10 players en route to a major title.

The 2022 Wimbledon Championships marked the event's first edition since 1998 in which Federer did not compete. Nadal returned to Wimbledon for the first time in three years; however he incurred an abdominal injury during the tournament. He progressed to the quarterfinals to face Taylor Fritz, defeating him in a five-set encounter that further aggravated his injury. He then withdrew from the tournament before his semifinal encounter against Nick Kyrgios, the latter of whom then advanced to his first major final. Djokovic successfully defended his title by defeating Kyrgios in four sets in the final to win his 21st major title, thereby passing Federer and placing him one behind Nadal. He tied Pete Sampras for the second-most Wimbledon men's singles titles at 7, one behind Federer's all-time record of 8 titles.

At the 2022 US Open, Djokovic withdrew from another major for being unvaccinated, while Federer did not compete due to injuries. Nadal's attempt to win his 23rd major title was thwarted by an upset in the fourth round by Frances Tiafoe. Medvedev's later elimination guaranteed a new champion (which would be Carlos Alcaraz), making this the 13th time that a major would feature a new champion since Federer's first Wimbledon title in 2003, and the third consecutive year that the US Open would feature a new champion.

On 23 September 2022, Federer retired from professional-level tennis at the 2022 Laver Cup, having struggled with a knee injury for the past couple of years, ending the age of the Big Three. He played his last match on Team Europe in doubles partnering Nadal, on a team that also included Djokovic and Murray: the last professional-level tournament to feature the Big Four together.

At the 2023 Australian Open, Djokovic returned to play and won his 10th Australian open title, matching Nadal's record of 22 men's singles majors. He also joined Nadal in ownership of double digit titles at a single major.

Career statistics

Grand Slam tournaments

The Big Three are the top-three all-time men's leaders in Grand Slam singles titles won, as well as finals reached. Djokovic has reached 33 finals, Federer 31 finals, and Nadal 30 finals. They are the only three men in history to win eight or more singles titles at a single Grand Slam tournament: Nadal with 14 French Open titles, Djokovic with 10 Australian Open titles, and Federer with 8 Wimbledon titles.

Combined performance timeline (best result)
 Since the year of first Slam win.

Grand Slam winners

*

ATP Finals

Combined performance timeline (best result)
 Since the year of first ATP Finals qualification.

Big Titles

Current through the 2023 Australian Open.

Outright record underlined.
¤ denotes titles were won in different tournaments.

ATP rankings

The Big Three monopolized the top spot in the ATP singles rankings 899 weeks (equivalent to 17 years). Djokovic has been ranked No. 1 for an ATP record 380 weeks, Federer for 310 weeks, and Nadal for 209 weeks. Each player has occupied the top position at the end of the year at least five times, with Djokovic holding the ATP record with seven.

Combined rankings timeline (best result)
 Since the first year-end No. 1 finish.

Outright records indicated in bold.

Head-to-head matchups

The respective rivalries between the Big Three are considered to be some of the greatest tennis rivalries of all time, and are the three most prolific men's rivalries of the Open Era. Amongst the three of them they have played 149 matches against each other, 49 of which were at Grand Slam events. They contested in 71 finals, including 23 Grand Slam finals, more than any other trio in tennis history. Currently, Djokovic leads his head-to-head record against both Federer and Nadal. Federer has delivered the most bagels against the other two with four, while receiving only one.

Results by court surface
Nadal is dominant on clay, particularly at the French Open, where he has won all six matches against Federer and eight of ten against Djokovic.

Two walkovers (2014 ATP Finals final and 2019 Indian Wells semifinal) are not included in the table.

Results by tournament level

Overall major record comparison

Outright records and winning head-to-head records indicated in bold.

Grand Slam title race
The Big Three have been competing to win the most Grand Slam men's singles titles of all time. Federer first led the trio by winning his first Grand Slam singles title at 2003 Wimbledon. He broke Pete Sampras's all-time record 14 Grand Slam titles at 2009 Wimbledon. Following the 2010 Australian Open, Federer had 16 titles, Nadal 6, and Djokovic 1, the peak of Federer's lead over Nadal and Djokovic. After winning the 2016 French Open, Djokovic came to within 2 titles of Nadal (14 vs. 12), but over the next two years, Nadal and Federer extended their lead over Djokovic again; following the 2018 French Open, Federer, Nadal, and Djokovic had 20, 17, and 12 titles, respectively. During the 2010s, Federer's lead gradually shrank, culminating in Nadal tying Federer's record 20 titles with his win at the 2020 French Open. Subsequently, Djokovic's three victories in 2021 brought him on an equal footing with Federer and Nadal, when for the only time all three players had an equal number of titles. At the 2022 Australian Open, Nadal surpassed both Federer and Djokovic by claiming the title, and went on to claim his 22nd Grand Slam trophy at the 2022 French Open. Djokovic subsequently won the 2022 Wimbledon and the 2023 Australian Open, surpassing Federer and tying Nadal at 22 Grand Slam titles. Federer retired on 23 September 2022 with 20 Grand Slam titles.

National and international representation
see also ITF team competitions: Olympics, Davis Cup, Hopman Cup and
ATP team competitions: Laver Cup, ATP Cup, United Cup

Legacy and recognition

Current and former professionals
Fellow top players, including David Ferrer, Tomáš Berdych, Jo-Wilfried Tsonga, Stan Wawrinka and Andy Roddick have all spoken about the dominance of the Big Three (and Murray until 2017) and the challenge they have faced in matching them. Many former top professionals have also spoken about the topic, including Björn Borg, Andre Agassi, Pete Sampras and Goran Ivanišević.

David Ferrer declared in 2013:

Media
Since 2010, when the Big Four increasingly began to dominate the tour as a group, many articles and reports have concentrated mainly on the members of the Big Four and their chances in upcoming tournaments, with smaller sections devoted to all other players.

The presence of the Big Four is generally seen to have had a positive impact on tennis, making the sport more exciting and in turn attracting more attention. However, with all four members being European, this may have had a potentially negative effect on tennis popularity in North America compared to previous decades, when Americans were regularly at the top of men's tennis. It has also been argued that the dominance of the Big Four has made the game predictable or even boring.

Alternative concepts and proposals

'Big Four'
Even initially, some tennis commentators, including Murray himself, spoke of a "Big Three" or "Trivalry", due to Murray's lesser achievements than those three players. In 2014, statistician Nate Silver labelled the group the 'Big Three and a Half'. Murray's overall record against the Big Three is 29–56 (as of year end 2021). However, Murray features in the top ten on a number of Open Era records, including in quarterfinals, semifinals, and finals reached at the Majors, and is to date the only person in history to have won two gold medals in singles at the Olympic Games, and only the second player in the Open Era (after Andre Agassi), to have won a Grand Slam singles event, an ATP Finals, an ATP Masters, and an Olympic singles gold, as well as reach world No. 1 in the ATP rankings. He reached world No. 1 after the Big Three reached it, though he had by that time spent 76 weeks as No. 2.

Murray's three Majors, two Olympic Games victories, ATP Finals, Masters titles and his success in reaching the world no. 1 ranking, all since 2012, saw him listed more comfortably alongside the other three members during the mid-2010s. His rise to reach the world No. 1 ranking in November 2016 and keep it to finish the year at the top position further helped arguments about him belonging in a "Big Four". However, given Murray's injury-ridden exit from the tennis elite after his 2016 triumphs, and the Big Three's continued dominance through year-end 2019, the "Big Four" label has been increasingly confined to the 2008–2017 period.

'Big Five' suggestions
Occasionally, it was claimed that the current era in tennis could be seen as featuring a "Big Five", with Juan Martín del Potro, Marin Čilić and Stan Wawrinka each suggested as additional expansions to the then Big Four. Wawrinka is the only active player outside the Big Four to have won multiple Slam titles with three (the same number as Murray), defeating Djokovic and Nadal on the way to the 2014 Australian Open title, Federer and Djokovic to win the 2015 French Open, and Djokovic to win the 2016 US Open. He also holds a positive win–loss record in Grand Slam singles finals, winning three of four (the loss being to Nadal in the final of the 2017 French Open), as opposed to Murray who has won only three from eleven (a 27.27% strike rate). However, Wawrinka has reached seven fewer Grand Slam singles finals, has won 13 fewer Masters titles than Murray, and has peaked at only number 3 in the world rankings. Wawrinka himself has downplayed the suggestion that he be included in an expanded "Big Five", describing Murray as "well ahead" of him.

Golden era
Some, including Steffi Graf and John McEnroe, believe the presence of the Big Four has coincided with that of a new "Golden Era" in men's tennis since 2008, wherein depth, athleticism and quality have never been better. The era has been compared to that of Rod Laver, Ken Rosewall, Roy Emerson and John Newcombe throughout the 1960s and that of Björn Borg, Jimmy Connors, John McEnroe and Ivan Lendl during the late 1970s and early 1980s.

Novak Djokovic and Roger Federer have both recognized the period as a golden era for tennis, though Federer tempered discussion around the all-time-greatest status of the Big Four in 2012, commenting:

The term Golden Era has also been applied to other famous eras in tennis history including the mid-1970s to 1980s, and the 1920s to the 1930s.

Prize money
Djokovic, Federer, Nadal make up the top three prize money leaders of all time (not adjusted for inflation).

Additionally, they collectively own the 10 biggest single season payouts ranging from $13.06 million to $21.15 million.

Notable matches
With a combined total of 149 matches played, the Big Three have played many notable matches against each other. The 2008 Wimbledon final, 2009 Australian Open final, 2012 Australian Open final, 2013 French Open semifinal, 2017 Australian Open final, 2018 Wimbledon semifinal and 2019 Wimbledon final are considered some of the greatest tennis matches of all time. Djokovic saved double match points against Federer at the 2010 and 2011 US Open semifinals and the 2019 Wimbledon final, whereas Federer ended Djokovic's 43-match winning streak in the 2011 French Open semifinals. Nadal stopped Djokovic from completing a non-calendar year Grand Slam at the 2012 French Open and has delivered eight of Djokovic's defeats at the tournament, while Djokovic has delivered two of Nadal's three losses at Roland Garros and outlasted him in the longest major final in history at the 2012 Australian Open. Federer ended Nadal's Open Era record 81-match winning streak on clay at the 2007 Hamburg Masters, while Nadal ended Federer's Open Era record 65-match winning streak on grass and five-year dominance at Wimbledon in the 2008 final, and twice denied Federer the non-calendar year Grand Slam at the 2006 and 2007 French Opens.

 2005 Miami Open final – Federer beat Nadal in five sets their first final against each other.
 2005 French Open semifinal – Nadal defeated Federer in four sets on the way to his maiden major title.
 2006 Italian Open final – Nadal prevailed over Federer in a five-set, five-hour epic. 
 2006 French Open final – Nadal thwarted Federer's bid to achieve the non-calendar year Grand Slam by triumphing in four sets. It was also Federer's first loss in a major final.
 2006 Wimbledon final – Federer triumphed over Nadal in four sets to win his fourth consecutive Wimbledon title. This was Nadal's first loss in a major final and Federer's first win over Nadal at a major.
 2007 Hamburg Masters final – Federer defeated Nadal for the first time on clay, ending Nadal's 81-match winning streak on the surface. It was one of two victories Federer scored against Nadal on clay.
2007 French Open final – Nadal denied Federer a second bid to complete the non-calendar year Grand Slam. This was only Federer's second loss in a major final, and second to Nadal.
 2007 Wimbledon final – Federer defeated Nadal in five sets.
 2007 Canadian Open final – Djokovic beat Federer in three sets in their first final against each other.
 2008 Hamburg Masters semifinal – Nadal defeated Djokovic in three dramatic sets.
 2008 Wimbledon final – Nadal prevailed over Federer in five sets in the then-longest Wimbledon final of all time. Some consider this the greatest match in tennis history.
 2009 Australian Open final – Nadal beat Federer in five sets for his first hard court major title.
 2009 Madrid Masters final – Nadal defeated Djokovic in three close sets in one of their longest matches.
 2010 US Open semifinal – Djokovic beat Federer in five sets while saving two match points in the final set.
 2011 Miami Open final – Djokovic beat Nadal in three close sets, finishing the first quarter of the season with a 24–0 winning record.
 2011 French Open semifinal – Federer beat Djokovic in a close four-set match that could have gone either way. It was Djokovic's first loss of the season.
 2011 Wimbledon final – Djokovic defeated Nadal in four sets to win his first Wimbledon title. This was Djokovic's first win over Nadal at a major, after losing in the first five attempts.
 2011 US Open semifinal – Djokovic beat Federer in five sets while saving two match points in the final set − a repeat of the previous year's match.
 2012 Australian Open final – Djokovic outlasted Nadal in five sets. This is the longest major final ever, clocking in at 5 hours and 53 minutes.
 2012 French Open final – Nadal bested Djokovic in four sets to win his seventh French Open title, surpassing Björn Borg's record of six, and denying Djokovic's attempt at a non-calendar year Grand Slam.
 2013 Monte-Carlo Masters final – Djokovic defeated Nadal to end his eight-year winning streak at the event, the longest win streak at a single tennis tournament (46 matches).
 2013 French Open semifinal – Nadal beat Djokovic in five sets. It's one of three matches where Nadal was taken to the deciding set at the French Open.
 2014 Wimbledon final – Djokovic defeated Federer in five sets.
 2015 Wimbledon final – In a rematch of the previous final, Djokovic needed only four sets to down Federer.
 2017 Australian Open final – Federer beat Nadal in five sets to win his first major in four-and-a-half years, and ending a six-match losing streak against Nadal at the majors.
 2018 Wimbledon semifinal – Djokovic, who was ranked world No. 22, defeated world No. 1 Nadal in five sets to reach the final. It was his biggest win in almost two years.
 2018 Paris Masters semifinal – Djokovic beat Federer in three sets in one of the year's best matches.
 2019 Wimbledon final – Djokovic prevailed over Federer in a fifth-set twelve-all tiebreaker, after saving two championship points in the final set, in the longest final in Wimbledon history.
2021 French Open semifinal – Djokovic defeated Nadal in four brutal sets, delivering Nadal's third-ever loss at the French Open.
2022 French Open quarterfinal – Nadal beat Djokovic in four sets in a record 10th meeting at one tournament.

See also
 Big Four career statistics
 The Four Musketeers

Notes

References

External links
 Novak Djokovic official site
 Roger Federer official site
 Rafael Nadal official site

Nicknamed groups of tennis players
Novak Djokovic
Rafael Nadal
Roger Federer
Tennis rivalries
Trios
2000s in tennis
2010s in tennis
2020s in tennis